Charles Godfrey may refer to:
Private Charles Godfrey, fictional character from British television comedy Dad's Army
Charles Godfrey (entertainer) (1851–1900), English music hall performer
Charles Godfrey (courtier) (1648–1714), British courtier and politician
Charles Godfrey (Australian cricketer) (1860–1940), Australian cricketer
Charles Godfrey (English cricketer) (1862–1941), former Sussex cricketer
Charles Godfrey (American football) (born 1985), American football safety
Charles Godfrey Gunther (1822–1885), Democratic mayor of New York
Charles Godfrey Leland (1824–1903), US humorist and folklorist
Charles Godfrey (physician) (1917–2022), Ontario politician, physician, and opponent of plans to build the Pickering Airport
 Godfrey Webb (1914–2003) British author who wrote under the name Charles Godfrey.

See also
Charles Godfray (born 1958), British zoologist